The term Sangh or Sangha means an assembly or congregation. The usage of the term includes:

Sangha (Buddhism), the monastic community in Buddhism
Sangha (Jainism), the fourfold community of pious followers of Jainism
Tamil Sangams, a legendary literary assembly in ancient Tamil Nadu
Sangh Parivar, a group of Indian nationalist organizations
Rashtriya Swayamsevak Sangh, Hindu revivalist organization in India
Hindu Swayamsevak Sangh, a Hindu cultural organisation in many countries

See also
 Sanga (disambiguation)
 Sangam (disambiguation)
 Sangha (disambiguation)